Aílton Graça (born September 9, 1964) is a Brazilian actor.

Selected filmography
 Carandiru (2003)
 Nina (2004)
 Meu Tio Matou um Cara (2004)
 América (2005)
 Cobras & Lagartos (2006)
 Querô (2007)
 Sete Pecados (2007)
 Peacetime (2009)
 Cama de Gato (2009)
 Família Vende Tudo (2011)
 Avenida Brasil (2012)
 Império (2014)

References

External links

1964 births
Living people
Male actors from São Paulo
Brazilian male television actors
Brazilian male telenovela actors
Brazilian male film actors